John Christopher Roper (born November 21, 1971) is a former Major League Baseball pitcher. He played in parts of three seasons in the majors, from  until , for the Cincinnati Reds and San Francisco Giants.

Sources

Major League Baseball pitchers
Cincinnati Reds players
San Francisco Giants players
Gulf Coast Reds players
Charleston Wheelers players
Chattanooga Lookouts players
Indianapolis Indians players
Phoenix Firebirds players
Nashua Pride players
Baseball players from North Carolina
1971 births
Living people